Geoffrey Allan Sheppard (18 December 1890 – 22 May 1940) was an English first-class cricketer who played two matches for Worcestershire in 1919, both at New Road. His highest score was 11 in the first of his four innings, against Gloucestershire.

Notes

External links

English cricketers
Worcestershire cricketers
1890 births
1940 deaths